WMDH may refer to:
Winchester District Memorial Hospital
Warith Deen Mohammed High School, a school within the system of Mohammed Schools (Georgia)